Rhytidoporus is a genus of burrowing bugs in the family Cydnidae. There are at least three described species in Rhytidoporus.

Species
These three species belong to the genus Rhytidoporus:
 Rhytidoporus barberi Froeschner
 Rhytidoporus compactus (Uhler, 1877)
 Rhytidoporus indentatus Uhler, 1877

References

Further reading

External links

Cydnidae
Articles created by Qbugbot